Subodh Sen (1917-1989) was an Indian politician belonging to the Communist Party of India (Marxist).  His parents were Nirendra Binod Sen and Labbanya Sen. He was elected to the Lok Sabha, lower house of the Parliament of India from Jalpaiguri in 1980.

References

External links
  Official biographical sketch in Parliament of India website

1917 births
1989 deaths
Communist Party of India (Marxist) politicians from West Bengal
People from Jalpaiguri
India MPs 1980–1984
Lok Sabha members from West Bengal